Piker, vin og sang was a Norwegian sitcom starring Herodes Falsk and Tom Mathisen. The show was a spoof of the adult entertainment industry.

The show premiered in 1998 and had reruns in 1999.

Plot
Urban Tassing publishes men's magazines, while his sister Susanne is more serious. She is married to Stig Benny Tyllingseter, a priest in Frogner. Kurt Uglesett is a photographer and Urbans friend. The receptionist is the Russian import Marika. The plot is centered on the publishing house Hibischus and their two heirs.

Cast

External links
Full Ekstase 
 

TV3 (Norway) original programming
1998 Norwegian television series debuts
1998 Norwegian television series endings
Norwegian television sitcoms
1990s Norwegian television series